The Search for Animal Chin is a 1987 skateboarding film featuring the Bones Brigade. It is one of the first skateboarding films to have a plot, rather than simply a collection of skateboarding stunts and music videos.

Plot summary 
The Bones Brigade embark on a quest to find the first skateboarder, the mythological Won Ton "Animal" Chin who had gone missing. Their journey takes them to different locations including Hawaii, California, Nevada, and Mexico where they meet friends and skate different spots along the way. It culminates in the discovery of the secret Chin Ramp, a back-to-back double half pipe featuring a spine and a tunnel. They never find the actual Animal Chin, but come to realize that in their search they discover the true meaning of their journey, the pure fun of skateboarding.

Cast 
Bones Brigade:
Tony Hawk - Himself
Steve Caballero - Himself
Mike McGill - Himself
Lance Mountain - Himself
Tommy Guerrero - Himself
C. R. Stecyk III - Emerson "Won Ton Animal" Chin - Himself (credited as Emerson Chin)

The film also includes:
San Francisco Scene: Jim Thiebaud, Jesse Martinez, Bryce Kanights, Doug Smith
Bakersfield Scene:  Chris Borst, Bobby Reeves, Charlie Dubois, Ray Underhill, Adrian Demain, Donny Griffin, Kevin Lambert
Rad Party Scene:  Mike Vallely, Rodney Mullen, Per Welinder, Natas Kaupas, Arron Murray, Kevin Harris, Johnny Rad

Also, in non-skating roles are Skip Engblom as a bouncer and Gerrit Graham as Alan Winters, the head of Slash Skates.

Legacy 
The iconic ramp featured in the movie was rebuilt at Woodward West Skatepark in Tehachapi, California for the 30th anniversary of the film. The original Bones Brigade reunited and skated the ramp design that no one has skated in 30 years - the original was torn down after filming.

See also 
Animal Chin - a late-'90s ska-punk band named after the movie
Animal Chin - a song by experimental jazz band Jaga Jazzist

References

External links 
 

Skateboarding videos
1987 films
1987 action films
1980s English-language films
Chinatown, San Francisco in fiction